The 1954 Gator Bowl may refer to:

 1954 Gator Bowl (January), January 1, 1954, game between the Texas Tech Red Raiders and the Auburn Tigers
 1954 Gator Bowl (December), December 31, 1954, game between the Auburn Tigers and the Baylor Bears